Abid Surti or Aabid Surti (born 5 May 1935) is a painter, author, cartoonist, journalist, environmentalist, playwright and screenwriter from India. He was given a National Award by the government of India in 1993 for writing a series of short stories called the "Teesri Aankh".

Life
Abid Surti was born in a Gujarati Muslim family on 5 May 1935 at Vavera, near Rajula, Gujarat, India to Gulam Hussain and Sakina Begum. In his childhood, at the age of 5, he almost got carried away by flood in the Tapti river near Surat. The family later shifted to Bombay and he spent his childhood in Dongri area of Mumbai. His father was follower of Sufism. He joined the J. J. School of Art in 1954 and obtained a Diploma in Arts. He was greatly influenced by the writings of 20th-century Bengali novelist, Sharat Chandra Chatterji. Besides being a writer in Hindi and Gujarati, he is also an expert in Urdu. He started his career as a freelancer. In 1965, he married Masooma Begum; they have two sons from this marriage.

Writings
Surti has written short stories, novels, plays, children's books and travelogues. Several of his books have been translated into regional languages. He has also been writing for Hindi and Gujarati newspapers and magazines for over 40 years and received a National Award for his short-story collection Teesri Aankh in 1993. He became an author by accident. When his first love broke down due to family pressure, the teenaged Aabid had no one to confide in – so he began putting his story on paper. The story was published in Gujarati in 1965 as Tootela Farishta (Fallen Angels) and proved to be an unexpected success.

He has written more than 80 books, including 45 novels, 10 short story collections and 7 plays.

The autobiographical novel Musalman was an account of his childhood in the poverty-ridden Dongri area of Mumbai. His latest novel, Sufi, describes the parallel lives of two friends: the author himself and a man called Iqbal Rupani, who rose to become the kingpin of the Mumbai underworld in the 1960s and 1970s. In 1975, his fictional version based on the Devil's Bible, entitled The Black Book, created a nationwide controversy. Even amidst critical acclaim, it was translated into seven languages and voted Book of the Year in Kannada. He earned the nickname the "Salman Rushdie of India" after his Black Book was published. He has together with his son Aalif Surti and Chandrika Vyas, Rima Kashyap also penned a controversial and hard-hitting novel called In Name of Rama inspired by a true incident during the demolition of the Babri Masjid.

In 2007, he was awarded the Hindi Sahitya Sanstha Award by the Uttar Pradesh government, and was given an award by the Gujarat government for his children's literary work Rangat. Among his other novels are Canal and Daagh. He has also worked as a television and film script-writer. He was the editor of the Gujarati annual magazine Dayaro for many years.

Recently, he has sued the makers of the Bollywood film Atithi Tum Kab Jaoge, which he says used his Gujarati novel Bauter Varas No Babo, published in 1976 and later translated into Hindi as Bahatar Saal Ka Baccha.

He has written graphic children's novels in Hindi, including Buddh kyun muskuraye 2500 saal baad (Why did the Buddha smile after 2500 years).
He has also written satirical gazal with common English words.

Works
Gujarati

 Tootela Farishta (1965)
 Dhutro
 Aabh ma khilelu phool
 Kapurush Mahapurush
 Pagle Pagle Pyar
 Soofi
 Kundali
 Fokatlalno Varghodo
 Adhura anek
 Vasant avyano mane vahem
 Nana Nana Rakshash
 Aathmo akash
 Kala gulab
 Pāpana pārano pradeṡa
 Ram asrey
 Rang badalti Roma
 Radata Gulmohar
 Boter varasno babo
 Mari shreshth vartao
 Alag Matina Marad
 Baraf na chhera
 Ek zalak Japan ni
 Dagh
 Sukhano relo same par
 Musalman (translated into Eng. as Sufi)
 Jaldi Kar, Juliet (play)

Hindi
Collections

 10 Pratinidhi Kahaniyan
 21 Shreshtha Kahaniyan
 365 Kahaniyan (collection of stories of the well-known author)

Novels

 Kathavachak
 Adhi Stri
 Bahata Paani
 Bahattar Saal Ka Bachcha (translated from Guj)
 Besabab
 Biswin Sadi Ka Aakhri Dashak
 Aadmi aur Chuhe
 Chamatkari Ladaki
 Cabaret Dancer
 Charitraheen
 Daag
 Dastoor
 Kale Gulab
 Kapurush Mahapurush
 Khoya Hua Chehra
 Kokh Se Kabra Tak Sati
 Kora Canvas
 Labangi
 Maan
 Mere Papa Ki Shadi
 Soonsaan
 Tanha
 Vasak Sajja

Stories

 Atankit
 Bijliyan
 Dhup Chhaon
 Gujrati Ki Shreshtha Vyangya Kathaen
 Teesri Aankh

Travel
 Awara Abid

Satire
 365 Chutkule (selection of jokes)
 Bundabandi

Plays
 Munchon Wali Begam

English

Novels

 The Black Book (Kaali Kitaab)
 In name of Rama
 The Golf Widow
 Little nino and his secret beard.

Plays
He is Radha

Paintings
Surti has been acclaimed as a painter, credited with using creative and original techniques to paint with oil and watercolours. His use of acrylic colours applied to Italian art paper is also said to be out of this world. An accomplished painter, he has held 16 exhibitions in India and abroad. In his early years, he invented an innovative technique called "mirror collage" which won critical acclaim in Japan. In 1971, the Indian government commissioned a short film to showcase his creative work.

Cartoons and comic-books
The first cartoon characters he created were in 1952–53 for a Gujarati magazine Ramakadu. It consisted of a comic feature of four pages in colour with three prominent characters – a boy, a girl and a monkey, entitled Rang Lakhudi. As a cartoonist, he later created the lovable simpleton Dhabbuji. The original and popular cartoon strip has been one of the longest-running comic strips in India, running without a break for over 30 years. It was the weekly comic strip that first appeared in Hindi magazine Dharmyug. He also created another comic book character, Bahadur, which achieved a large fan following, when the comics started to be published in Indrajal Comics from 1978. He also created other comic book characters like Inspector Azad, Inspector Vikram and a lady character named Shuja. The cartoon Dhabbuji and comics of Bahadur, Inspector Azad, Inspector Vikram and Shuja were all also published in English. Raj Kapoor once wanted to make a film based on Inspector Azad, showing that the popularity of his comic strips were high. Further, his famous comic strips Doctor Chinchoo Ke Chamatkar, which was published in the Hindi magazine Parag from 1963 to 1965 is being serialised by the National Book Trust as Doctor Chinchoo Ke Kaarnamein.

As an environmentalist
Abid Surti founded Drop Dead, a water conservation initiative in Mumbai in 2007. Every Sunday, along with a plumber and an assistant, he visits houses in and around Mira Road and fixes dripping taps. He simply replaces old O-ring rubber gaskets with new ones. The idea struck him in 2007 when he noticed the dripping tap in his friend's house. "A tap that drips water once every second wastes about 1,000 litres of water every month so imagine how much we all waste," he points out. Surti and his assistants raise awareness through posters and pamphlets. He pays for all expenses from his pocket.

Documentary
Pramod Pati has directed a documentary on the life of Abid Surti.

Awards and recognition 
Abid Surti is featured as Indian comics legend creative in the Legend Calendar 2019 released by Comix Theory as featured legendary artist for the month of January. He has been awarded National Award 1993, Hindi Sahitya Sanstha Award, Gujarat Gaurav.

References

External links
Aabid Surti at Penguin India

1935 births
Living people
20th-century Indian male writers
20th-century Indian novelists
Activists from Maharashtra
Artists from Mumbai
English-language writers from India
Gujarati-language writers
Gujarati people
Hindi-language writers
Indian cartoonists
Indian comics writers
Indian environmentalists
Indian male dramatists and playwrights
Indian male screenwriters
Indian male novelists
Indian Muslims
Novelists from Maharashtra
Screenwriters from Mumbai
Sir Jamsetjee Jeejebhoy School of Art alumni
Writers from Mumbai
People from Surat